The Reunion is a radio discussion series presented by Kirsty Wark which reunites a group of people involved in a moment of modern history. It has been broadcast on BBC Radio 4 since July 2003, with 163 episodes presented by the first presenter, Sue MacGregor.

The series brings together four or five participants, sometimes from opposing sides. The first episode reunited the team behind the world's first IVF baby, Louise Brown. Other examples include Robben Island prisoners in Cape Town, representatives from Labour and BBC to discuss the Hutton Inquiry, perpetrators and victims of the Brighton hotel bombing, and Maids of Honour from the 1953 Coronation. The panel discussion is interspersed with archive audio and narration of the event by the presenter.

MacGregor announced that the series of 2019 would be her last. Kirsty Wark was appointed as the new presenter in May 2020, and her first episode, bringing together participants in the Black Wednesday exchange rate crash of 1992, was broadcast on 16 August 2020.

The format for The Reunion was conceived by the series producer David Prest and is owned by Whistledown Productions who license the programme to BBC Radio 4. The programme won a gold award for the Best Speech Programme at the 2007 Sony Radio Academy Awards and was also voted radio programme of the year at the 2016 Broadcasting Press Guild Awards. In a Radio Times poll in February 2019, The Reunion was voted the 27th greatest radio programme of all time.

The Reunion has inspired two feature films. Made in Dagenham (2010) was based on an episode broadcast in September 2003 featuring the women machinists who went on strike at the Ford factory in Dagenham in 1968. The film's producer Stephen Woolley heard the programme, and his company, Number 9 films, optioned the script from Whistledown Productions who became consultants to the film and were credited as Associate Producers. Misbehaviour (2020) was similarly inspired by a particularly tense 2010 edition of the programme which brought together the women's liberation protestors who disrupted the 1970 Miss World competition, with former tournament host Michael Aspel, Mecca employee Peter Jolley, and that year's Miss World, Jennifer Hosten.

Programmes

References

External links

2003 radio programme debuts
BBC Radio 4 programmes